Frozen Creek is an unincorporated community in Breathitt County, Kentucky, United States. Its post office closed in 1983.

A post office was established in the community in 1850. It was likely named Frozen Creek for a section of the local creek of the same name that early settlers often found treacherous in the winter.

References

Unincorporated communities in Breathitt County, Kentucky
Unincorporated communities in Kentucky